Heavy Metal Breakdown is the debut studio album by German heavy metal band Grave Digger, released on 20 October 1984 via Noise Records. The music in this album is strongly influenced by German heavy metal band Accept and its then-vocalist Udo Dirkschneider.

Although singer Chris Boltendahl was credited for all the music and lyrics, it was only a technical issue. "At the time we didn't have the money to enroll all four members to GEMA. So we only enrolled Chris", said Gerd Hanke then-manager of Grave Digger in book The Story of Noise Records. "Lyrics had always been a problem for Chris" - added guitarist Peter Masson. "His school English was quite bad. During my time with Grave Digger, Gerd wrote most of the lyrics."

Track listing
Music composed and arranged by Grave Digger and lyrics by Chris Boltendahl, except where indicated.

1984 German version

1984 US version

Notes
The 1994 bonus tracks are from the following:
 "Violence" is taken from the 1983 split album Rock from Hell - German Metal Attack
 "Shoot Her Down", "We Wanna Rock You" and "Storming the Brain" are taken from the 1984 EP Shoot Her Down
 "Shine On" and "Tears of Blood" are taken from the 1985 split album Metal Attack Vol. 1
 "Don't Kill the Children" and "Girls of Rock 'n' Roll" are taken from the 1994 compilation album The Best of the Eighties
 "Stronger Than Ever" and "I Don't Need Your Love" are taken from the 1986 album Stronger Than Ever, in which case they were called Digger at the time

Personnel
Band members
 Chris Boltendahl – vocals
 Peter Masson – guitars
 Willi Lackman – bass
 Albert Eckardt – drums

Additional musicians
Dietmar Dillhardt – keyboards on "Yesterday"

Production
Karl-Ulrich Walterbach – producer
Harris Johns – engineer, mixing
Grave Digger – arrangements
Bernd Gansohr – cover painting

References

1984 debut albums
Grave Digger (band) albums
Noise Records albums
Megaforce Records albums
Albums produced by Harris Johns